Ramniwas Gawriya (रामनिवास गावड़िया) is an Indian politician from Rajasthan. He is elected as M.L.A. from Parbatsar constituency, in 2018 assembly elections, on ticket of Indian National Congress. Previously he has been a member of National Students' Union of India.

External links
2018 Election results

References

Living people
21st-century Indian politicians
1991 births
Indian National Congress politicians from Rajasthan